Kahnab (also Romanized as Kahnāb; also known as Geyanī, Gīānū, Gīnū, Jīānū, and Kayno) is a village in Bonab Rural District, in the Central District of Zanjan County, Zanjan Province, Iran. At the 2006 census, its population was 65, in 21 families.

References 

Populated places in Zanjan County